The Italian Football Federation (FIGC), known colloquially as Federcalcio, is the governing body of football in Italy. It is based in Rome and the technical department is in Coverciano, Florence.

It organises the Italian football league and Coppa Italia. It is also responsible for appointing the management of the Italy national football team (men's), women's, and youth national football teams. The Italy national futsal team also belongs to the federation.

History
The Federation was established in Turin on 26 March 1898 as the Federazione Italiana del Football (FIF), on the initiative of a Constituent Assembly established on 15 March by Enrico D'Ovidio. Mario Vicary was elected the first official president of the FIF on 26 March.

When, in 1909, it was suggested to change the Federation's name at an annual board elections held in Milan, the few teams attending, representing less than 50% of the active clubs, decided to send a postcard asking all teams to vote for the five new names discussed during the meeting. The new name approved was "Federazione Italiana Giuoco del Calcio" (FIGC), and since then has been the name of the Italian Football Federation. The debut of the Men's National Team was on 15 May 1910, at Arena Civica, wearing a white jersey where Italy defeated France 6–2. The following year, the blue jersey was introduced on the occasion of the match against Hungary as a tribute to the colour of the House of Savoy.

This Italian Federation was an amateur federation respecting FIFA rules when it became a member in 1905. At the end of World War I, the federation had seen impressive development and several footballers were judged to be professional players and banned according to FIFA agreements.
From 1922 to 1926, new and more severe rules were approved for keeping the "amateur" status real and effective, such as footballers' residence and transfer controls but the best players were secretly paid and moved from other provinces illegally. Foreigners had to live in the country to get a residence visa and a players' card. When, in 1926, the Italian Federation Board resigned following a very difficult referees' strike, the fascist Lando Ferretti, president of the Italian Olympic Committee (C.O.N.I.), nominated a Commission to reform all Leagues and federal rules. The Commission signed a document called the "Carta di Viareggio" (Rules issued in Viareggio) where football players were recognised as "non-amateurs" and able to apply for refunds for the money they had lost while playing for the football teams. They had to sign the declaration not being professional players so that FIFA rules were respected because for FIGC; they were appearing as "amateurs" receiving just refunds. It was the beginning of professionalism in Italy.
The Carta di Viareggio reduced the number of foreign players to just one per match so that the majority of Hungarians remained jobless and returned to their country.

Commissioner Bruno Zauli led the FIGC renovation process (1959), with the establishment of three Leagues (Professional, Semi-professional, Amateur) and the creation of the Technical and Youth Sectors.

Between 1964 and 1980, foreign players were banned from the Italian league, primarily to revive the national team.

In December 1998, the FIGC celebrated its centenary at the Stadio Olimpico in a match featuring Italy vs World XI, with Italy winning 6–2.

The FIGC was placed in administration in May 2006 as a result of the 2006 Italian football scandal and was put under the management of Guido Rossi. In May 2006, Rossi was chosen and accepted the role of president of Telecom Italia. This appointment caused angry reactions from club presidents in Italy.
On 19 September, Rossi resigned as Commissioner of FIGC. On 21 September, Luca Pancalli, head of the Italian Paralympic Committee, was chosen to replace Rossi.
On 2 April 2007, a new President was elected, with former Vice-President Giancarlo Abete being voted by 264 grand electors out of 271.

Following the 2014 FIFA World Cup Abete resigned and Carlo Tavecchio was elected president of the Federation and Michele Uva as general manager. The new governance began many reforms on the main aspects of Italian football, particularly through the use of young players trained in Italy, the economic sustainability - financial professional clubs, start the reorganization of the operating structure of the FIGC. In support of the activity and with a view of maximum transparency, the FIGC public a series of documents: Football Report, Integrated Budget (evolution of the Social Report), Management Report, Income Statement of Italian football. On 20 November 2017, Tavecchio resigned as Italian Football Federation president, seven days after Italy failed to qualify for the 2018 FIFA World Cup, the first time since 1958.

Honours

National teams

National youth teams

National futsal team

List of Presidents

Notes

References

External links
 
Italy at FIFA site
Italy at UEFA site
Italian calcio glossary

Italy
 
Football
1898 establishments in Italy
Sports organizations established in 1898
Football in Rome